Ashley Deon Charters (born March 13, 1986) is an American, former collegiate All-American, retired professional 2-time All-Star right-handed softball infielder, originally from Beaverton, Oregon. She played college softball for the Washington Huskies softball as shortstop and second basemen and was part of the 2009 Women's College World Series championship team of the Pac-12 Conference. She is one of the select NCAA players in the 300 hits, 200 runs and 100 stolen base club. She later played two seasons with Team USA softball. After originally being drafted No. 11 in the National Pro Fastpitch, she went on to join the USSSA Pride and win a title in 2013.

Career

Charters played for USSSA Pride of National Pro Fastpitch from 2011 to 2013, helping the Pride win the 2013 Cowles Cup championship before retiring from professional softball in February 2014. She also played on the United States women's national softball team, winning gold medals with the team in the 2009 World Cup of Softball, 2010 World Cup of Softball, and 2010 Women's Softball World Championship.

Since 2012, Charters has been co-CEO of headgear small business GlitterBandz.

Statistics

References

External links
 
 
 
 

1986 births
Living people
Softball players from Oregon
Sportspeople from Beaverton, Oregon
USSSA Pride players
Washington Huskies softball players